The 1965–66 Midland Football League season was the 66th in the history of the Midland Football League, a football competition in England.

Clubs
The league featured 20 clubs which competed in the previous season, along with two new clubs, joined from the North Regional League:
Lincoln City reserves
Scunthorpe United reserves

League table

References

External links

M
Midland Football League (1889)